This is a list of films which have placed number one at the weekend box office in the United Kingdom during 2018.

Films

Notes

References

External links
Weekend box office figures | BFI

2018
United Kingdom
2018 in British cinema